Patru may refer to:

Olivier Patru (1604–1681), French lawyer and writer
Patru, Iran, a village in Razavi Khorasan Province, Iran